Michael Dennis Booker is an American lawyer and former state legislator in Arkansas. He lived in Little Rock, Arkansas and served in the Arkansas House of Representatives in the 1990s.

Booker was reprimanded by the Committee on Professional Conduct in 2004.

References

Year of birth missing (living people)
Living people
Members of the Arkansas House of Representatives
20th-century American politicians